Valérie Trierweiler (née Massonneau; born 16 February 1965) is a French journalist and author. She has hosted political talk shows and has contributed to Paris Match. She is best known for having been the partner of the president of France, François Hollande, until January 2014.

Early life
Valérie Massonneau was born in Angers, the fifth child of six. Her father, Jean-Noël Massonneau, had lost a leg on a landmine during the Second World War, when he was 13, and died at the age of 53, when his daughter was 21. Her mother worked at the front desk of the Angers ice rink following the death of her father.

Massonneau studied history and political science and obtained a Diplôme d'études supérieures spécialisées in political science from the University of Paris 1 Pantheon-Sorbonne.

Career

In 2005, Trierweiler began to host political talk shows, especially interviews, on the Direct 8 television channel. She fronted the weekly political talk show Le Grand 8 until 2007 and with Mikaël Guedj has co-hosted the weekly show Politiquement parlant ("politically speaking") since September of that year.

In 2012, Trierweiler announced that she would keep her contract as a journalist with the Paris Match magazine during the presidency of her boyfriend, Francois Hollande.

On 12 June 2012, Trierweiler caused widespread controversy by tweeting in support of Olivier Falorni, who was standing for election as a dissident socialist candidate at La Rochelle, against Ségolène Royal, Hollande's former partner. Hollande had already made public his own support for Royal's campaign.

In 2017, Trierweiler published her first novel, Le secret d'Adèle. The book is about the life of Adele Bloch-Bauer, best known for Gustav Klimt's Portrait of Adele Bloch-Bauer I.

Personal life
 
Trierweiler's first marriage, to childhood friend Franck Thurieau, ended in divorce with no children. Her second marriage was to Denis Trierweiler, a sub-editor at Paris Match magazine, and a writer and academic. This marriage produced three children and divorce proceedings took three years (2007–2010).

Trierweiler met François Hollande during the parliamentary elections of 1988 while he was living with Ségolène Royal. They began their relationship in 2007, while she was still married, and made it public in October 2010 after her divorce was publicized.

In January 2014, a story in the celebrity magazine Closer featured seven pages of alleged revelations and photos about an affair between Hollande and the French actress Julie Gayet. Trierweiler was subsequently admitted to hospital on 10 January "for rest and some tests". On 17 January, Hollande made his first private visit to see her in hospital. On 25 January, it was announced her relationship with Hollande had ended.

In September 2014, a book written by Trierweiler, Merci pour ce moment (Thank You for This Moment), was published. It details her relationship with Hollande and their breakup.

Bibliography
Merci pour ce moment (Paris: Les Arènes, 2014).

References

External links

1965 births
Living people
21st-century French novelists
French Roman Catholics
François Hollande
French memoirists
French television personalities
French women journalists
French women novelists
Official social partners of national leaders
Paris Match writers
People from Angers
University of Paris alumni
21st-century memoirists